Ducornet may refer to:

Louis Joseph César Ducornet, the French painter (1806–1856)
Pierre Ducornet, French World War I flying ace (1898–1963)
Rikki Ducornet, The American artist and writer (1949- )